Rail Corporation New South Wales (RailCorp) was an agency of the State of New South Wales, Australia established under the Transport Administration Act 1988 in 2004. It was a division under the control of Transport for NSW since the latter's establishment in 2011. RailCorp was converted into a state-owned corporation and renamed Transport Asset Holding Entity (TAHE) on 1 July 2020.

Until its conversion to TAHE, RailCorp held rail property assets, rolling stock and rail infrastructure in the Sydney metropolitan area and limited country locations in the state and it makes these assets available to Sydney Trains and NSW TrainLink for their operations. It also managed the NSW Government's contract with the Airport Link Company. At the time of conversion to TAHE, the acting chief executive of RailCorp was Sydney Trains chief executive Howard Collins.

Additionally, until 2013, RailCorp also formerly operated passenger train services in New South Wales under the brand CityRail, and maintained rail infrastructure within the New South Wales Metropolitan Rail Area. From July 2013, operation and maintenance functions were transferred to the newly created Sydney Trains and NSW Trains agencies, which were also subsidiaries of RailCorp, leaving RailCorp as the legal owner of a portfolio of $28.6 billion of railway property, mostly within the metropolitan area. In July 2017, Sydney Trains and NSW Trains ceased to be subsidiaries of RailCorp and became standalone independent agencies.

History
In January 2004, after much criticism and public perceptions of blame shifting between units of the State Rail Authority for operational failings, RailCorp was formed taking over the passenger train operations of CityRail and CountryLink, and responsibility for maintaining the greater metropolitan network from the Rail Infrastructure Corporation.

Initially governed by a Board of Directors as a State-owned corporation, changes to the  resulted in RailCorp ceasing to be a state-owned corporation and becoming a NSW statutory authority on 1 January 2009. Further changes to the  resulted in abolition of the Board effective 1 July 2010 and the repositioning of RailCorp as an agency of Transport NSW. This was followed by further structural changes under the Transport Legislation Amendment Act 2011, which saw Transport NSW replaced by Transport for NSW, which was established as a controlled entity of the Department of Transport, with Rail Corporation New South Wales a controlled entity of Transport for NSW. RailCorp reports to the Minister for Transport.

Restructure
In May 2012 the Minister for Transport announced a restructure of RailCorp from July 2013 that would:
 
 establish Sydney Trains to operate services in the Sydney Metropolitan area bounded by Berowra, Richmond, Emu Plains, Macarthur and Waterfall
 establish NSW TrainLink to operate all other passenger services including those of CountryLink  
 transfer capital projects and planning functions to Transport for NSW
 establish Transport Cleaning Services, a specialist division responsible for train cleaning
 establish a customer service division
 reduce RailCorp's function to asset owner
 offer voluntary redundancies to 750 management and support staff

The restructure resulted in Sydney Trains and NSW Trains, which were subsidiaries of RailCorp, operating railway passenger services in New South Wales under the Sydney Trains and NSW TrainLink brands. While being subsidiaries of Railcorp, Sydney Trains and NSW Trains were not controlled entities of RailCorp, but were instead controlled by Transport for NSW. Due to the restructure, CityRail and CountryLink were also abolished. In July 2017, Sydney Trains and NSW Trains ceased to be subsidiaries of RailCorp and became standalone and independent agencies of Transport for NSW.

Transition into the Transport Asset Holding Entity 
RailCorp was converted into a state-owned corporation and renamed Transport Asset Holding Entity (TAHE) on 1 July 2020. The new entity would continue to own assets on behalf of Transport for NSW. The Residual Transport Corporation (RTC), which was formed in July 2017, would then own assets not suitable for TAHE ownership.

Corruption investigation
In 2007 and 2008, RailCorp was investigated by the Independent Commission Against Corruption. In a series of seven reports released during 2008, the ICAC reported that more than $21 million in improper contracts and deals through the procurement of services in just three years. In June 2009, RailCorp terminated the contract of Vicki Coleman, its chief information officer, and it was claimed that she was at the centre of claims of dishonesty and corruption.

The ICAC recommended charges against 33 people; yet by April 2012, only eight people had faced the courts. Those that received custodial sentences included Allan Michael Blackstock (4½ years) and Renea Hughes (3½ years). Youssef (Joe) Madrajat was directed to undertake community service. Further charges are expected to be laid on others, and several are still waiting for the outcome of criminal proceedings.

Emergency response
RailCorp maintains a statewide Emergency Response Unit. The function of this unit is to attend incidents, such as derailments. Formerly known as the State Rail Fire Service, the unit is based in Sydney and respond to emergency incidents involving the rail network including automatic fire alarms within the underground and nearby stations. The unit also undertakes cross-training with Fire and Rescue NSW. The unit is currently equipped with a number of vehicles including Mercedes and International pumpers and a specialist rapid rail response unit which is able to travel via the road and rail network for rescue operations. The unit's motto is Semper Paratus, translated from Latin to mean Always Ready.

See also 

 Rail transport in New South Wales
 Railways in Sydney
State Rail

References

External links
RailCorp

Government agencies of New South Wales
Railway companies of New South Wales
Railway infrastructure companies of Australia
Australian companies established in 2004
Railway companies established in 2004
2020 disestablishments in Australia
Railway companies disestablished in 2020